MasterChef: The Professionals is a BBC television competitive cooking show which aired on BBC Two from 2008 to 2019, and on BBC One since 2020. It is a spin-off from the main MasterChef series, for professional working chefs. Introduced in 2008, Gregg Wallace and India Fisher reprised their roles as co-judge and voiceover respectively. Michel Roux Jr., a two-Michelin-star chef, assisted, from 2009, by his sous-chef Monica Galetti. Since 2011, Sean Pertwee has taken over Fisher's role as voiceover.

In 2014, Roux Jr left the show due to "a conflict in commercial interests". Marcus Wareing replaced him. In 2022, Galetti announced that she was leaving the show; she was replaced as a judge by Anna Haugh.

Format
Typically, the show runs for seven weeks and twenty-five episodes (reduced to eighteen from Series 15 onwards) transmitted from early November until Christmas, although the precise number of shows per week, number of contestants, the running order and nature of the challenges and the number of chefs eliminated at each round has varied from series to series. There are four weeks of "heats" (the final show of each week being a quarter final), a "knockout" week, a semi-final week and a finals week. Below is a synopsis of a typical series:

Heats
Each heat week begins with six chefs per show (this was cut to four per show  in Series 15). The three (or four) remaining chefs then participate in the quarter final at the end of that week.

Skills test (Series 2 onwards): The professional judges demonstrate the preparation of a specific dish, or the preparation of an ingredient. The contestant is then required to reproduce that dish in a specific time limit – typically 15–20 minutes. The judges then taste the contestant's attempt and give feedback. In Series 2–4, Monica Galetti would eliminate 2 of the 6 contestants at this stage, meaning only four went through to cook for Michel Roux Jr.
Signature dish: The contestants are then given one hour to prepare their signature dish which will showcase their skills and abilities. This is then scrutinised by the judges, who then eliminate three of the six (two of the four from Series 15 onward) contestants, based on their performance in both this, and the skills test.

Quarter final

Invention test: The three surviving contestants from the heat are given 1 hour to invent a dish from a set larder of ingredients. The contestants are then given feedback. In Series 1 the invention test took place during the heats (before being replaced in Series 2 by the Skills Test, with the invention test being moved to the quarter final). In some series four chefs competed in this round, which was reduced to three in the next round.
Cook for the critics: The four (or three) contestants are required to prepare a three-course meal for a panel of three restaurant critics – typically Jay Rayner, Tom Parker-Bowles and William Sitwell. The meal is also sampled by the professional judges (but not Gregg Wallace). The contestants do not get feedback from the critics directly. Based on this challenge and performance in the invention test, one chef is eliminated, and the remainder go through to knockout week or the semi-final

Knockout Week
Typically 10 chefs are left by this stage. The precise challenges have varied over the series.  From  Series 15 onwards, Knockout Week was dropped and the competition progressed directly to the semi-final.

Knowledge test (Series 1–7): Michel Roux Jr or Marcus Wareing demonstrates the preparation of a classic dish which requires a high degree of technical skill and ability. The chefs are then required to reproduce the dish themselves using only a basic recipe lacking in precise details of the cooking methods involved. Typically, the larder supplied included "rogue" ingredients that were not actually used in the dish, intended to probe the contestants' palates and knowledge of flavours.
Cook for a guest chef (Series 1–6): The contestants are required to cook a dish for a mystery renowned chef who visits the MasterChef kitchen (in Series 5 & 6 this was Marcus Wareing). The guest chef did not participate in the usual judging discussion between Roux and Wallace, and it would result in an elimination.
Invention test with a difference (Series 5–6, 8): The chefs are required to invent a single dish, but must only use basic cooking methods, for instance they are prohibited from using the sous-vide cookers. In Series 6, three of the chefs gained automatic passage into the next round, whilst the remaining three must cook off against each other to avoid elimination, where one chef was eliminated.
Mass catering (Series 8): The chefs are divided up into two teams where they have to demonstrate their ability to cook low cost, high quality dishes in large quantity in a short timeframe. Typically they are sent to a large workplace canteen, or a major sporting event. This is then followed by a cook-off in the studio in which one further chef is eliminated.

Semi-finals

Service in a top restaurant:  The six surviving contestants are divided into either pairs or teams of three and are each sent to work in an acclaimed British restaurant under the supervision of the Head Chef, or Chef Patron and work a lunch service. The chefs must then prepare the restaurant's signature dish, and then receive feedback from the Chef Patron on their interpretation of the dish. They then return to the MasterChef Kitchen were they cook against each other, and one chef is eliminated, based on their performance in the cook-off, and from the feedback from the restaurant test.
Invention with leftovers: The five remaining chefs are presented with scraps of food along with a basic larder and are instructed to produce a dish using them. One further chef is eliminated at the end of this round.
 Pop-Up Restaurant   Eight chefs (four chefs in two episodes) must design their own pop-up restaurant and run a service for a panel of critics consisting of other pop-up restauranteurs.  After the challenge, the chefs return to the MasterChef kitchen for a cook-off where one is eliminated, leaving six chefs going into Finals Week.

Finals Week

Showstopping dish: The six surviving contestants are asked to produce a high quality dish that will showcase their knowledge and skill, and justify their presence in the final. Two are eliminated here to leave the final four.
Chef's table: The four surviving contestants are required to work as a team to cook a banquet for a party of top British chefs, most of whom possess Michelin stars. Each chef is given responsibility for a course (starter, fish, main, dessert).  At the end of each course, one of the guest chefs gives the contestant feedback. No elimination takes place at the end of this round.
Three-starred restaurant: (Series 1-14) The finalists are sent to a restaurant of international acclaim, either in the UK or abroad, which typically holds the coveted 3 Michelin stars. The chefs participate in a lunch service in that restaurant, and learn how to cook the establishment's signature dishes and receive guidance from the Chef Patron. They also create their own dishes using the same techniques used in that restaurant.  The chefs return to the MasterChef kitchen where they cook off against each other and one is eliminated to leave the final three.
Cook for the Critics II, (Replaced the 'three starred restaurant' challenge in Series 15), the four chefs competed in a two stage challenge where they cooked off against each other by preparing a showstopping dish based on an exotic place they had been to, then each had to prepare a three course meal for the same panel of critics from the quarter finals.  Based on their performance in the two rounds, one chef is eliminated at the end of this round to leave the final three.
Final cook-off: Returning to the MasterChef kitchen, the three finalists are given two hours to cook a three course meal for the MasterChef judges where one will be crowned Champion for the series.

Series guide

Series 1 (2008)

Derek Johnstone won the first series on 19 September 2008, and went on to take a job with Michel Roux Jr at Le Gavroche restaurant in London.

Series 2 (2009)

The second series began on 14 September 2009 at 8:30 pm on BBC2 and was won by Steve Groves on 22 October 2009. On 6 June 2010 the series was awarded a BAFTA in the Features category at the British Academy Television Awards 2010, fending off competition from The Choir, James May's Toy Stories and Heston's Feasts.

Series 3 (2010)

The third series began on Monday 20 September 2010, the eventual winner being 30-year-old Claire Lara from Liverpool. She was pregnant at the time.

Series 4 (2011)

The fourth series began on 7 November 2011, with India Fisher's voiceover replaced with Sean Pertwee. The series concluded on 15 December 2011, with finalists Steve Barringer and Claire Hutchings being beaten by winner Ash Mair, 34, from Tasmania. He cooked a final three-course menu comprising a starter of roasted monkfish tail with lentils and Basque piperade; roast rump of lamb with braised lamb neck potato croquette; and a dessert of Spanish bread and butter pudding with vanilla parfait.
This was the first series where two semi finalists were put through to the final from the same semi final heat. This resulted in 4 finalists for the first time and in the cook off Oliver Farrar, was knocked out from the finals week.

Series 5 (2012)

Series 5 was first broadcast on 5 November 2012, with the final aired on 13 December 2012. Sean Pertwee continued to provide the voiceover. The title was jointly awarded (for the first time in MasterChef history) to Anton Piotrowski, Chef patron of Röski restaurant in Liverpool, and freelance event caterer Keri Moss of South London. The third finalist was Oli Boon.

Series 6 (2013)

Series 6 started in November 2013. In the final, broadcast on 12 December 2013, Steven Edwards was crowned the winner. The final task was to prepare a three-course meal for judges Roux Jr, Galetti and Wallace. The two other finalists were Scott Davies and Adam Handling.

Series 7 (2014)

Series 7 started on 4 November 2014, and was Wareing's first series as a judge. In the final, broadcast on 23 December 2014, Jamie Scott was crowned victor. The other two finalists were Brian McLeish and Sven-Hanson Britt.

Series 8 (2015)
Series 8 began airing on 10 November 2015. It was won by Mark Stinchcombe.

Series 9 (2016)

Series 9 began airing on 8 November 2016. Scottish chef and college lecturer Gary Maclean was crowned the winner.

Series 10 (2017)

Series 10 began airing on 7 November 2017. In the final, aired on 21 December 2017, Craig Johnston was crowned champion. The other two finalists were Louisa Ellis and Steven Lickley.

Series 11 (2018)

Series 11 began airing on 6 November 2018. In the final, broadcast on 20 December 2018, Laurence Henry was crowned the champion.

Series 12 (2019)

Series 12 began airing on 5 November 2019. In the final broadcast on 19 December 2019, Stu Deeley was crowned the champion.

Series 13 (2020) 

Series 13 began airing on 10 November 2020. This is the first series to air on BBC One, following the move from BBC Two. Due to COVID-19 restrictions, the series was shortened to just 18 episodes and featured no challenges that took place outside the MasterChef kitchen to ensure social distancing was maintained. In the final broadcast on 17 December 2020, Alex Webb was crowned the champion.

Series 14 (2021) 

Series 14 began airing on 8 November 2021. In the final broadcast on 16 December 2021, Daniel Lee was crowned the champion.

Series 15 (2022) 

Series 15 saw significant changes to the format of the show with the departure of Monica Galetti (although she did appear as a guest on the Chef's Table round), and her replacement with Anna Haugh. The duration of the show was cut from six weeks to five, with the number of contestants reduced, the removal of Knockout Week and some changes to the challenges. Nikita Pathakji was crowned the champion.

Winners

Transmissions

Regular series

Specials

 MasterChef: The Professionals: Michel's Classics – 30 minute master class episodes; aired 8 November 2010, 9 and 16 December 2011, 17–18 December 2012
 MasterChef: The Professionals Uncovered – A look at the highs and lows of the past five series; aired 27 February 2013
 Masterchef: The Professionals Rematch – Five finalists return to the kitchen to show the judges how much their food has evolved; aired 27 December 2018 and 23 December 2019
 MasterChef: The Professionals: A Festive Knockout – Four of the most memorable chefs from previous series return to show how their skills have progressed since they took part in the show; 2 episodes; aired 29 and 30 December 2020.

International versions

Legend:
 Still in production  
 No longer airing

See also

MasterChef
Junior MasterChef

References

External links

BBC television game shows
2008 British television series debuts
2010s British television series
2020s British television series
Television series by Banijay
English-language television shows
Reality television spin-offs
UK
Cooking competitions in the United Kingdom